The Elwood Downtown Historic District is a national historic district located at Elwood, Madison County, Indiana. The district encompasses 51 contributing buildings and 1 contributing object in the central business district of Elwood. It developed between about 1887 and 1952, and includes notable examples of Late Victorian, Romanesque Revival, Neoclassical, and Art Deco style architecture. Notable buildings include the Calloway Block (c. 1895), Dehority Block (1894), St. Joseph Catholic Church (1899), United Methodist Church (1899), U.S. Post Office (1911), Carnegie Library (1901), former Elwood City Hall (1899), the Leeson's Building (c. 1930), and the Opera House (c. 1887).

It was listed in the National Register of Historic Places in 2002.

References

Historic districts on the National Register of Historic Places in Indiana
Victorian architecture in Indiana
Romanesque Revival architecture in Indiana
Neoclassical architecture in Indiana
Art Deco architecture in Indiana
Historic districts in Madison County, Indiana
National Register of Historic Places in Madison County, Indiana